Nobody's Fool is a 1936 American comedy film directed by Arthur Greville Collins and written by Ralph Block, Ben Markson, and Jerry Sackheim. The film stars Edward Everett Horton, Glenda Farrell and Cesar Romero. The movie's working title was "Unconscious". It was released by Universal Pictures on June 1, 1936. A naive country boy goes to New York City where he gets mixed up with real estate swindlers.

Plot
At the Better Business Boosters convention, Will Wright (Edward Everett Horton) who works as a waiter,  interrupts the guest speaker and asks him what can be done to improve the city's welfare. In response, George Baxter (Pierre Watkin) tells him that he would be happier living in New York. Will decides to leave town. After arriving in New York, he is mistaken for an economist named Mr. Wight. When Ruby Miller (Glenda Farrell) a con artists realized the mistake she quietly draws him away. Ruby, a member of a group of con artists plans to extort money from gangster Dizzy Rantz (Cesar Romero) after discovering that he does not own a piece of land under his gambling house. Afraid of Dizzy's reaction, they ask Will to make the demand for them and convincing him that they will build apartments for working people if they gain access to Dizzy's land. When the group discovered that the land is actually owned by Mary Jones (Florence Roberts). They ask Will to charm Mary into signing the land over to him.

Dizzy who mistakenly believing that Will is connected to the District Attorney office, agreed to meet him. Meanwhile, Jake Cavendish (Frank Conroy) the head of the group and Ruby's boyfriend is planning to murder Will. later, Will calls a meeting with Dizzy and the other member of the group including Jake and Ruby. Will suggests that the owners of the land should build affordable housing. Dizzy is hesitated until Mary says she will force Dizzy to move his buildings off her land. Dizzy and Jake formed a legitimate partnership. And Jake calls off the contract on Will's life, with Will given an honorary membership in the home development league of New York. Ruby who has fallen in love with Will, tells him to look her up.

Cast  

Edward Everett Horton as Will Wright
Glenda Farrell as Ruby Miller
Cesar Romero as Dizzy Rantz
Frank Conroy as Jake Cavendish
Warren Hymer as Sour Puss
Clay Clement as Fixer Belmore
Henry Hunter as Doc 
Florence Roberts as Mary Jones
Edward Gargan as Tom
Pierre Watkin as George Baxter

Reception
The New York Times movie review said: "Nobody's Fool, which moved into the Albee Theatre in Brooklyn yesterday with Universal's splendid picturization of "Show Boat," makes its chief bid for fame as a harbinger of Summer doldrums in the cinema. A feeble mélange of soporific comedy and far-fetched melodrama, the new film works an unfair hardship on such talented comedians as Edward Everett Horton, Glenda Farrell and Warren Hymer—not to mention its audience. Put together with apparently more speed than inspiration, the film narrates the oft told story of a country yokel who comes to Manhattan and outsmarts a gang of real estate racketeers intent on defrauding a nice old lady of three feet of property in Fifty-third Street. That's the gist of "Nobody's Fool", which would probably make a compact three-reeler."

References

External links

1936 films
American comedy films
1936 comedy films
Universal Pictures films
American black-and-white films
Films directed by Arthur Greville Collins
1930s English-language films
1930s American films